Kimcote and Walton is a civil parish situated in the Harborough district, in Leicestershire, England, approximately 4 miles north east of Lutterworth. The population of the civil parish at the 2011 census was 600. The parish includes the villages of Kimcote and Walton (historically also known as Walton in Knaptoft). All Saints Parish Church is situated in Kimcote. Walton once had a church but it was defunct in about 1630. Walton still has a Baptist Chapel and a Public House, the Dog and Gun.

The parish was created in 1898 from the merger of the civil parishes on Kimcote and Walton in Knaptoft.

The parish was the base for many stockingers during the 19th century.

References

External links
Census 2001 Parish Profile
Parish Council
Ordnance Survey mapping of Kimcote and Walton
 Heritage records in Kimcote and Walton
Photographs of Kimcote from Geograph
Photographs of Walton from Geograph
The Grange - Bed and Breakfast accommodation

Civil parishes in Harborough District